Perivolia (before 1926: Ρουσβάναγα - Rousvanaga) is a village and a community in the southwestern part of Arcadia, Greece. The Greek National Road 7/E55 (Corinth - Tripoli - Kalamata passes southeast of the village. The community consists of the villages Perivolia and Vrysoules.

Population

See also
List of settlements in Arcadia

References

Megalopolis, Greece
Populated places in Arcadia, Peloponnese